This is a list of wineries in South Africa arranged by wine region.  A winery is a building or property that produces wine, or a business involved in the production of wine, such as a wine company. Some wine companies own many wineries. Besides wine making equipment, larger wineries may also feature warehouses, bottling lines, laboratories, and large expanses of tanks known as tank farms.

Wine producing regions in South Africa include*: Barrydale, Breedekloof, Breede River Valley, Cape Point, Calitzdorp, Constantia, Darling, Durbanville, Elgin, Elim, Franschhoek, Ladismith, Little Karoo, Montagu, Orange River Valley, Oudtshoorn, Paarl, Robertson, Stellenbosch, Swartland, Swellendam, Tulbagh, Tygerberg, Wellington and Worcester, and Mosselbay.

List of wineries in Constantia and Cape Point

List of wineries in Durbanville

List of wineries in Elgin and Walker Bay 

Kershaw wines

List of wineries in Franschhoek

List of wineries in Helderberg

List of wineries in Paarl and Wellington

List of wineries in Robertson

List of wineries in Stellenbosch

List of wineries in Swartland

List of wineries in Tulbagh

List of wineries in Worcester

List of wineries in KwaZulu-Natal

See also

 History of South African wine
 South African wine
 Wine regions of South Africa

References

Venter, Chris: Die wynmakerfamilie van Zonnebloem, Simondium, 1915-1963, published in Historia, Volume 57, Issue 2, November 2012
Jim Clarke, The wines of South Africa, Infinite Ideas Limited, 2020
James Seely, The Wines of South Africa, Faber & Faber, 1997

External links

 Wined (your digital companion to the South African winelands)

 
South African wine
Wine regions of South Africa
Lists of companies of South Africa
South Africa
South African cuisine-related lists